Amber Atherton (born 9 February 1991, in Hong Kong)  is a British entrepreneur, currently the Head of Strategic Communities at Discord. Atherton joined Discord through the acqui-hire of her community software startup Zyper in January 2021. She is known for co-creating and appearing in the reality television series Made in Chelsea. She also founded the e-commerce company My Flash Trash and visual recognition app Rubric.

Early life and Career 
Atherton was born and brought up in Hong Kong, and educated at boarding school in England. She began modelling as a teenager, appearing in Love magazine, i-D magazine and Tatler. As a child, Atherton coded, and set up various businesses before founding cult e-commerce company My Flash Trash when she was 17. She sold My Flash Trash in 2016 for an estimated £2 million.

Atherton gained celebrity as a creator of the popular UK reality television show Made in Chelsea. She has since focused on enterprise, appearing as a Business Buddy on the BBC's Young Dragon's Den show, Pocket Money Pitch and judging the UK's national enterprise challenge.
Atherton was listed as the "5th-Most Powerful Person in Digital Fashion" by British Vogue in 2011.

Atherton was featured in Forbes 30 Under 30, Europe: Retail & E-Commerce in 2016.

References

External links 
 

1991 births
Living people
20th-century Hong Kong women
21st-century British businesswomen
British female models
British jewellers
British people of Hong Kong descent
British retail company founders
British women company founders
Made in Chelsea
People from British Hong Kong